Busseto is a comune in the province of Parma, in Emilia-Romagna in Northern Italy with a population of about 7,100. Its history has very ancient roots which date back to the 10th century, and for almost five hundred years it was the capital of Stato Pallavicino, which eventually became part of the Duchy of Parma.

The first written sources the name "Busseto" were in the form of "Buxetum", which dates from the early twelfth century. It is believed that the town's name derives from "buxus" (meaning boxwood) or, in another form, as "busetum" (an enclosure for oxen).

The "Rocca", the fortress was built in the time of Adalberto Pallavicini, founder of the family, in the eleventh century. In the first half of the thirteenth century, it was completely rebuilt and surrounded by a moat and a drawbridge linking it to the square.  In time, however, it was destroyed and rebuilt several times and then lost the drawbridge and part of the walls. In 1857 it was again rebuilt almost entirely in the neo-Gothic style by architect Pier Luigi Montecchini. The present-day Rocca has preserved the original keep and the main tower. La Rocca, within which lies the Teatro Verdi, it is now the Municipal Palace, the seat of the municipality of Busseto.

Notable residents
Opera composer Giuseppe Verdi was born in the nearby village of Le Roncole in 1813 and he moved to the town in 1824. Other figures from the world of opera are associated with the town: until his death, retired tenor Carlo Bergonzi owned the hotel I due Foscari, which also hosts the Accademia Verdiana. Bass-baritone Luca Pisaroni grew up there from the age of four after his family moved to Busseto in 1979, where his father owned a car-repair firm and his mother was a teacher. It was in that town where, he noted, "you feel Verdi's spirit all over the place!"

and where his love of opera began. Italian journalist Giovannino Guareschi also lived in Le Roncole, and his Mondo Piccolo is set there.

Main sites associated with Giuseppe Verdi 

In the town and the local area many sites associated with the life of Verdi can be visited.  These include:

Le Roncole
The nearby village of Le Roncole was Verdi's birthplace on 10 October 1813. The house has been a national monument since 1901.

Casa Barezzi
Close by the main square is the home of Antonio Barezzi, the man who supported his early endeavours. He became both Verdi's patron and his father-in-law. In the upstairs lounge, the young Verdi gave his first public performance in 1830 and continued to frequent the house until the death of his benefactor.

The first portrait of Verdi and an oil depicting Antonio Barezzi is on display in the house. Verdi's letters are also on display. The Casa Barezzi is the headquarters of the Friends of Verdi; the organization oversaw the restoration of the building in 1979 and 1998. Since 2001, there has been a permanent exhibition of objects and documents related to Verdi and his relationship to the Barezzi family.

Churches of Santa Maria degli Angeli and San Michele Arcangelo
Both churches are nearby.  These are where Verdi played the organ.

Palazzo Orlandi
This is the house which Verdi bought in 1845. He lived there with Giuseppina Strepponi, not yet his wife, from 1849 to 1851. Verdi composed  Luisa Miller, Stiffelio and Rigoletto while living there.

Teatro Giuseppe Verdi
The Teatro Giuseppe Verdi is a small 300-seat theatre built by the municipality with Verdi's support, but not with his approval.  However, he did donate money for its completion.

National Museum of Giuseppe Verdi
he National Museum of Giuseppe Verdi is housed at the Renaissance Villa Pallavicino.

The museum was inaugurated on 10, October 2009 on the 196th anniversary of Verdi's birth.

Villa Verdi
In the nearby village of Sant'Agata, in the province of Piacenza, is the Villa Verdi, the house which he commissioned in 1848 while living in Busseto and where his parents lived until 1851, after which it became Verdi's home for the rest of his life. However, he lived there less frequently after the death of his wife, Giuseppina, in 1897.

Transportation 
Busseto has a railway station on the Cremona–Fidenza line.

Sister cities 
  Carry-le-Rouet, Bouches-du-Rhône, France
Friendship City: Sarasota, Florida, USA

See also
San Bartolomeo, Busseto
Sant'Ignazio, Busseto
Santa Maria degli Angeli

References 
Notes

Sources
Associazione Amici di Verdi (ed.) (1997), Con Verdi nella sua terra, Busseto. (in English)
Associazione Amici di Verdi (unk.), Con Verdi in Casa Barezzi, Busseto. (In English, French, and German)
Mordacci, Alessandra (2001), (trans. Studio Dott. Annita Brindani), An Itinerary of History and Art in the Places of Verdi, Busseto: Busseto Tourist Office. (In English)

External links
Busseto Tourist Office website
Verdi site with photos of Busseto locations, in English
Amici di Verdi website 
international-giuseppe-verdi-foundation website (in German, Italian, English, French, and Dutch)
Museo Nazionale Giuseppe Verdi located close to Busseto

Cities and towns in Emilia-Romagna
Giuseppe Verdi